This is a list of notable alumni/ae of The Fletcher School of Law and Diplomacy at Tufts University in Medford, Massachusetts.

Government, diplomacy, and international organizations
Maria Luisa Hayem, F08, Minister of Economy of El Salvador since 2019
Mulatu Teshome Wirtu, F90, President of Ethiopia since 2013
Rafeeuddin Ahmed, F56, former UN Under-Secretary General
Shafi U Ahmed, F86, former High Commissioner of Bangladesh to United Kingdom
Abul Ahsan, F62, former Bangladeshi Ambassador to the United States, and member of the Executive Board of UNESCO
Yasushi Akashi, F57, senior Japanese diplomat, former Undersecretary-General for Humanitarian Affairs and Emergency Relief Coordinator at the United Nations
Bolaji Akinyemi, F66, former Foreign Minister of Nigeria
Mimi Alemayehou, F98, Executive Advisor and Chair of Blackstone Africa Infrastructure L.P., former Executive Vice President of the Overseas Private Investment Corporation, former United States Director of the African Development Bank
Dato Serbini Ali, Brunei‘s ambassador to the United States of America
Sultan T. Al-Nahayan, GMAP01, United Arab Emirates Minister of Tourism & Trade
Joyce Aluoch, GMAP08, Judge to the International Criminal Court
Kaydor Aukatsang, Tibetan politician and advocate
Vigen Sargsyan, MALD 00, Minister of Defense of Armenia (2016-2018), Chief of Staff to the Office of the President Serzh Sargsyan (2011-2016)
Anthony Banbury, F92, United Nations Assistant Secretary-General for Field Support, former Special Representative of the Secretary-General and Head of the United Nations Mission for Ebola Emergency Response
Barbara Bodine, F71, Distinguished Professor in the Practice of Diplomacy and Director of the Institute for the Study of Diplomacy at Georgetown University, former U.S. Ambassador to Yemen and Kuwait
Tinatin Bokuchava, leader of women's wing of United National Movement in Georgia.
Matthew Bryza, F88, former Deputy Assistant Secretary of State for European and Eurasian Affairs, former United States Ambassador to Azerbaijan
Richard Burt, F71, former United States chief negotiator on START I and United States chair of Global Zero
Harold Caballeros, F06, former Secretary of State Ministerio de Relaciones Exteriores de Guatemala
Dante Caputo, F67, former President of the United Nations General Assembly
Tom Casey, F87, former Deputy Assistant Secretary for Public Affairs at the United States Department of State
Aizaz Ahmad Chaudhry, F, Pakistan Ambassador to the United States
Humayun Rashid Choudhury, F54, former President of the United Nations General Assembly, former Speaker of the Bangladesh National Parliament
Musa Javed Chohan, F84, former High Commissioner of Pakistan to Canada, former Ambassador to France and Malaysia
Erin Conaton, F95, former United States Under Secretary of Defense for Personnel and Readiness and former Under Secretary of the Air Force
Charles Crawford, former British Ambassador to Poland and Serbia
Walter L. Cutler, F54, former U.S. Ambassador to Congo-Kinshasa (1975–79), Tunisia (1982–84), and Saudi Arabia (1984–89)
C. Richard D'Amato, F67, former member of the United States China Economic and Security Review Commission, former senior foreign policy and defense advisor to the Democratic Senate leader, Senator Robert C. Byrd
Nathaniel Davis, former senior advisor to President Lyndon Johnson on Soviet and Eastern European affairs, and Assistant Secretary of State for African Affairs
Giorgos Dimitrakopoulos, F81, Greek politician and Member of the European Parliament
Michael Dobbs, former Chief of Staff of the British Conservative party, political thriller novelist
William B. Edmondson, F51, former U.S. Ambassador to South Africa
J. Adam Ereli, F89, Principal Deputy Assistant Secretary for the Bureau of Educational and Cultural Affairs, former United States Ambassador to Bahrain
Hernán Escudero Martínez, F74, Ecuadorian diplomat, former Ambassador to the Republic of Peru, former Permanent Representative to the United Nations and to the WTO in Geneva and former Chairman of the UNHCR Executive Committee.
Evelyn Farkas, F99, U.S. Deputy Assistant Secretary of Defense for Russia/Ukraine/Eurasia for the United States Department of Defense
Pieter Feith, F70, Head of Mission for the European Union-led Aceh Monitoring Mission (AMM)
Jeffrey Feltman, F83, United Nations Under-Secretary General for Political Affairs
Colette Flesch, F61, Member of Luxembourg's Parliament, former Deputy Prime Minister and Minister of Foreign Affairs of Luxembourg, former President of the Council of the EU
Jean Francois-Poncet, F48, Member of French Senate, former French Foreign Minister
Yusuf Garaad Omar, Somalia's Presidential Special Envoy to the Horn of Africa, Gulf of Aden and the Red Sea; Former Minister of Foreign Affairs, Former Ambassador to the United Nations.
Luis Gallegos, F83, Permanent Representative of Ecuador to the United Nations, former Ambassador of Ecuador to the United States
Shukri Ghanem, F73, former Prime Minister of Libya, former Libyan Minister of Oil and Gas
Giorgi Gomiashvili, F99, former Deputy Foreign Minister of Georgia
Kennedy Graham, MP for the Green Party of Aotearoa New Zealand
Michael A. Hammer, F87, United States Ambassador to Chile
Yoshiaki Harada, Member of the House of Representatives in the Japanese Diet
Bryce Harland, former Permanent Representative of New Zealand to the United Nations
Douglas Henderson, United States Ambassador to Bolivia (1963–1968)
John E. Herbst, F80, Office of the Coordinator for Reconstruction and Stabilization, U.S. State Department, former Ambassador to Ukraine and Uzbekistan
Robert Hormats, F66, Under Secretary of State for Economic, Business, and Agricultural Affairs, and former Vice Chairman, Goldman Sachs
Raffi Hovannisian, former Foreign Minister of Armenia, leader of the Heritage party
Jonathan Howe, F67, former Deputy Assistant to the President of the United States for National Security Affairs, former Special Representative for Somalia to United Nations Secretary-General Boutros Boutros-Ghali
Wolfgang Ischinger, F73, former Ambassador of Germany to the United States and UK, Chairman of the Munich Security Conference
Roberta S. Jacobson, F86, United States Assistant Secretary of State for Western Hemisphere Affairs
Ismat Jahan, F86, Ambassador of Bangladesh to Belgium, Luxembourg and the European Communities, former Permanent Representative of Bangladesh to the United Nations
Ahmad Kamal, former Ambassador and Permanent Representative of Pakistan to the United Nations
Marina Kaljurand, F95, member of the European Parliament for Estonia, former  Minister of Foreign Affairs and former Estonian Ambassador to Russia, United States, Mexico, and Israel
Kostas Karamanlis, F82, former Prime Minister of Greece
Olga Kefalogianni, F06, Greek Minister of Tourism
Shahryar Khan, former Special Representative of United Nations Secretary-General Boutros Boutros-Ghali to Rwanda, former Foreign Minister of Pakistan 
Shah A M S Kibria, former Minister of Finance of Bangladesh
Robert R. King, United States Special Envoy for Human Rights in North Korea
Michelle Kwan, F11, good-will ambassador; former figure skater
Enrique Ricardo Lewandowski, F81, current justice and former president of the Supreme Federal Court of Brazil
Liu Xiaoming, F83, Chinese Ambassador to the United Kingdom
Juan Fernando López Aguilar, F88, Chair of the Committee on Civil Liberties, Justice and Home Affairs in European Parliament, former Justice Minister of Spain
Lui Tuck Yew, F94, Minister for Transport in Singapore
William J. Luti, former Special Assistant to the President and Senior Director for Defense Policy and Strategy for the National Security Council
Winston Lord, F60, former United States Assistant Secretary of State for East Asian and Pacific Affairs
Sarah-Ann Lynch, the United States Ambassador to Guyana
Akjemal Magtymova,  F14, World Health Organization official
Graham Maitland, F06, South African Ambassador to Sudan
Freddy Matungulu, deputy division chief of the International Monetary Fund, former Finance Minister of the Democratic Republic of the Congo
Edwin W. Martin, former U.S. Ambassador to Burma
Edward E. Masters, F49, former U.S. Ambassador to Indonesia and Bangladesh
Cynthia McKinney, F80, former U.S. Representative from Georgia
David McKean, F86, U.S. Ambassador to Luxembourg, former Director of Policy Planning at the US Department of State, former Chief of Staff of the U.S. Senate Committee on Foreign Relations
Michael R. Meyer, F75, Director of Communication & Speech-writing for the UN Secretary General
Tariq M. Mir, former Ambassador of Pakistan to Sri Lanka, Iraq and Iran
Derek Mitchell, current United States Ambassador to Burma
William T. Monroe, F73, former U.S. Ambassador to Bahrain
Daniel Patrick Moynihan, F49, former U.S. Senator, former United States Ambassador to the United Nations
Bernd Mützelburg, F74, Germany’s special envoy for Afghanistan and Pakistan, former Ambassador to India
Harvey Frans Nelson, Jr., F50, former U.S. Ambassador to Swaziland
Phyllis E. Oakley, F57, former United States Assistant Secretary of State for Population, Refugees, and Migration (1994–97) and Assistant Secretary of State for Intelligence and Research (1997–99)
Vartan Oskanian, F83, former Foreign Minister of Armenia
Frank Pallone, F63, U.S. Representative from New Jersey
Farah Pandith, F95, Special Representative to Muslim Communities for the United States Department of State
Frank Craig Pandolfe, Vice Admiral of the U.S. Navy
Michael E. Parmly, former Chief of Mission of the United States Interests Section in Havana
Phạm Bình Minh, F92, Deputy Prime Minister and Foreign Minister of Vietnam
Thomas R. Pickering, F54, former U.S. Ambassador to the United Nations, Under Secretary of State, and Senior VP, International Relations, Boeing Co.; namesake of the prestigious Thomas R. Pickering Foreign Affairs Fellowship administered by the U.S. Department of State
Igor Pokaz, former Ambassador of the Republic of Croatia to the Russian Federation
Masihur Rahman, F80, former representative of Bangladesh to the World Bank, the Asian Development Bank, and the Islamic Development Bank
Bill Richardson, F71, former Governor of New Mexico, former United States Secretary of Energy and U.S. Ambassador to the United Nations
Iqbal Riza, F57, former Chief of Staff to the UN Secretary-General
Theodore E. Russell, First U.S. Ambassador to Slovakia, former Deputy Assistant Administrator for International Activities at the Environmental Protection Agency
Omar Samad, GMAP06, former Ambassador of Afghanistan to Canada
Juan Manuel Santos, F81, Nobel Peace Prize 2016, President of Colombia, former Chief Executive of the Colombian Coffee Delegation to the International Coffee Organization (ICO), former Minister of Foreign Trade, Minister of Finance, and Minister of Defense of Colombia
Abdulla Shahid, F91, Member of Parliament; former Speaker of Parliament; former Minister of Foreign Affairs, Former Chief of Staff to the President of the Maldives; former Chairman of South Asian Speakers and Parliamentarians Association
Antoinette Sayeh, F85, Director of the African Department, International Monetary Fund; former Finance Minister of Liberia
Sir David Serpell, F37, former British MP, British Foreign Office; author of the Serpell Report
Surakiart Sathirathai, F80, former Foreign Minister and Deputy Prime Minister of Thailand
Klaus Scharioth, F78, former Ambassador of Germany to the United States
Konrad Seitz, F67, German diplomat and scholar, former ambassador to China, India, and Italy
Radmila Šekerinska GMAP07, current defense minister of North Macedonia, former Deputy Prime Minister
Godfrey Smith, GMAP02, former Foreign Minister of Belize
William H. Sullivan, F47, former United States Ambassador to Iran (1977-1979), the Philippines (1973–1977), and Laos (1964–1969)
Mulatu Teshome, F90, President of the Federal Democratic Republic of Ethiopia
Shashi Tharoor, Member of Parliament of India, former Under-Secretary General for Communications and Public Information at United Nations
Mary Thompson-Jones, Deputy Chief of Mission, United States Embassy to the Czech Republic
Malcolm Toon, F38, former U.S. Ambassador (USSR 1963-1979, Czechoslovakia 1969-1971, Yugoslavia 1971-1975, Israel 1975-1976) 
Thomas Vajda, U.S. Ambassador 
Sandra Louise Vogelgesang, former Deputy Assistant Secretary of State, and U.S. Ambassador to Nepal
Mary Burce Warlick, United States Consul General of Australia, former United States Ambassador to Serbia
C. David Welch, Assistant Secretary of State for International Organizations, U.S. Ambassador to Egypt, Assistant Secretary for Near Eastern Affairs, Career Ambassador
Hassan Wirajuda, F84, former Foreign Minister of Indonesia
Peter Woolcott, F82, Ambassador and Permanent Representative of Australia to the United Nations
Philip D. Zelikow, F95, former Counselor of the U.S. Department of State and Executive Director of the 9/11 Commission
Edson Zvobgo, founder of Zimbabwe's ruling party Zanu-PF; later critic of Robert Mugabe

International finance and energy
Peter Ackerman, F69, Managing Director of Rockport Capital; former Director of International Capital Markets at Drexel Burnham Lambert
Shukri Ghanem, F73, former Libyan Minister of Oil and Gas; former Prime Minister of Libya
Robert Hormats, F66, Under Secretary of State for Economic, Business, and Agricultural Affairs, and former Vice Chairman, Goldman Sachs
Freddy Matungulu, Deputy Division Chief of the International Monetary Fund; former Finance Minister of the Democratic Republic of the Congo
Masatsugu Nagato, CEO of Japan Post Holdings; former CEO of Japan Post Bank; former Chairman of Citibank Japan
Bill Richardson, F71, former Governor of New Mexico; former United States Secretary of Energy and U.S. Ambassador to the United Nations
Antoinette Sayeh, F85, Director of the African Department, International Monetary Fund; former Finance Minister of Liberia
Walter B. Wriston, F42, former Chairman and CEO of Citigroup

Non-profits and NGOs
Peter Ackerman, F69, Founding Chair of the International Center on Nonviolent Conflict
Zainah Anwar, women's rights activist, former head of the Sisters in Islam
C. Fred Bergsten, F62, Senior Fellow and Director Emeritus, former Director of the Peterson Institute for International Economics, former United States Assistant Secretary for International Affairs, U.S. Department of Treasury
Craig Cohen, Executive Vice President of the Center for Strategic and International Studies
Charles H. Dallara, F75, Managing Director, Institute of International Finance, former Asst. Sec. for Int'l. Affairs, U.S. Department of Treasury
Dan Doyle, Executive Director of the Institute for International Sport
Marsha Evans, F76, former President of the American Red Cross and Girl Scouts of the USA
Hilary French, Vice President for Research at the Worldwatch Institute
Sakiko Fukuda-Parr, founder of the Journal of Human Development; former Director of the Human Development Report Office at the World Bank
Mark Krikorian, Executive Director of the Center for Immigration Studies
Matthew Levitt, Director of the Stein Program on Counterterrorism and Intelligence at the Washington Institute for Near East Policy
Bette Bao Lord, novelist and writer, Chair of the Board of Trustees of Freedom House
Jeremy Rifkin, F69, economist and writer, creator of the Foundation On Economic Trends
Kaare Sandegren, F53, former Secretary of International Affairs at the Norwegian Confederation of Trade Unions, former member of the Norwegian Nobel Committee
Crocker Snow, Jr., Director of the Edward R. Murrow Center for Public Diplomacy
Daniel Sokatch, CEO of the New Israel Fund
Sue Mi Terry, F98, Senior Fellow for the Korea Chair at the Center for Strategic and International Studies
Abiodun Williams, former president of The Hague Institute for Global Justice
Patrick Meier, author, inventor of crisis mapping and co-founder of WeRobotics.

Academia
Hassan Abbas, F02, F08, professor, National Defense University
Lisa Anderson, Provost of the American University in Cairo, former professor at Harvard University and SIPA at Columbia University
Arnaud Blin, French historian and political scientist, former researcher at the Institut Diplomacie et Défense, the French Institute for Strategic Analysis and the Ecole de la paix de Grenoble
Clayton Clemens, Professor of Government at The College of William and Mary
Richard N. Current, former Bancroft Prize-winning historian and University of Wisconsin Professor
Harriet Elam-Thomas, Director of the Diplomacy Program at the University of Central Florida, former U.S. Ambassador to Senegal
John E. Endicott, F74, Vice Chancellor of the Solbridge International School of Business and President of Woosong University
Oliver Everett, CVO, former Royal Librarian to the Sovereign of the United Kingdom
David W. Kennedy, F79, International Legal Scholar and Vice President International Affairs at Brown University
Peter F. Krogh, F66, Dean Emeritus and Distinguished Professor of International Affairs, Edmund A. Walsh School of Foreign Service at Georgetown University
Robert Legvold, F63, F64, F67, Professor at Columbia University, former director of the Harriman Institute
Mahmood Mamdani, F69, Professor of Government at Columbia University, Director of Columbia's Institute of African Studies, former President of the Council for Development of Social Research in Africa
Satoshi Morimoto, F80, Professor of international politics at Takushoku University, member of the Congressional Forum for a New Japan
Vali Nasr, F84, Dean of the Paul H. Nitze School of Advanced International Studies at Johns Hopkins University, former Professor of International Politics at The Fletcher School of Law and Diplomacy
Joseph W. Polisi, F70, President of The Juilliard School
Mitchell Reiss, Vice-Provost of International Affairs at The College of William and Mary, former United States Special Envoy for Northern Ireland, and Director of Policy Planning at the United States Department of State
Alan M. Wachman, F84, Professor of International Politics at The Fletcher School of Law and Diplomacy
Norman Wengert, F39, founder of the doctoral program in Environmental Politics and Policy at Colorado State University; author of the seminal work Natural Resources and the Political Struggle
Wu Teh Yao, former Professor of Political Science and Vice-Chancellor of the National University of Singapore, took part in the drafting of the Universal Declaration of Human Rights while working at the United Nations

Writers and journalists
Yusuf Hassan Abdi, former Director of IRIN
Doug Bailey, F62, founder of The Hotline, political consultant
Stephan Berwick, F95, author, martial artist, and actor known for his scholarly research on traditional Chinese martial arts
Fred D'Ignazio, F71, technology and education writer
Lord Michael Dobbs, F75, author of the House of Cards trilogy, former adviser to Margaret Thatcher, Conservative Peer
David Grann, F93, New York Times best-selling author
Tim Judah, front line reporter for The Economist and author
Yitzhak Aharon Korff, publisher of The Jewish Advocate, dayan of Boston's rabbinical court
Shahid Masood, Founder of talk shows in Pakistan
Beto Ortiz, Peruvian journalist, critic of Alberto Fujimori's government
James S. Robbins, F88, USA Today columnist, Senior Editorial Writer for Foreign Affairs at The Washington Times, winner of the Chairman of the Joint Chiefs of Staff Joint Meritorious Civilian Service Award
Abdulaziz Al-Saqqaf, F79, founder of the Yemen Times, Yemen's first English-language newspaper, winner of the National Press Club's International Award for Freedom of the Press
Howie Severino, F83, Filipino journalist, writer, producer and host, known for his documentaries on GMA Network
Najmuddin Shaikh, F62, writer for the Daily Times (Pakistan), former Pakistani diplomat
Shashi Tharoor, well known Indian author and former Under Secretary General at the UN

Military
Erin Conaton, F95, United States Under Secretary of the Air Force
Stephen L. Davis, Brigadier General, U.S. Air Force
Joseph F. Dunford, Jr., Chairman of the Joint Chiefs of Staff
Evelyn Farkas, F99, U.S. Deputy Assistant Secretary of Defense for Russia/Ukraine/Eurasia for the United States Department of Defense
Susan Livingstone, F73, former Undersecretary of the Navy
Richard W. Mies, former Commander in Chief of the United States Strategic Command
Frank Craig Pandolfe, Vice Admiral of the U.S. Navy
James G. Stavridis, F84, Dean of The Fletcher School; former Commander U.S. European Command, and NATO's Supreme Allied Commander Europe
Patrick M. Walsh, F93, U.S. Navy Admiral, Vice Chief of Naval Operations
Lui Tuck Yew, F94, Singapore's former Minister for Transport, Minister for Information, Communications and Arts and Chief of Navy

Private sector
Ignasius Jonan, GMAP05, Minister of Transportation, Indonesia
Jim Manzi, F79, founder and former CEO of Lotus
Kingsley Moghalu, F92, founder and Chief Executive Officer of Sogato Strategies S.A.
Neil Smit, F88, President of Comcast Cable; former President and CEO of Charter Communications
Dimitris Tziotis, F95, President and CEO of Cleverbank, an award-winning strategy consultancy
David Welch, F77, Regional President of Europe/Africa/Middle East/South West Asia for Bechtel and former Assistant Secretary of State for Near Eastern Affairs
Walter Wriston, F42, former Chairman and CEO of Citicorp

References

Tufts University